GURPS Fantasy II: Adventures in the Mad Lands is a supplement by Robin Laws, published by Steve Jackson Games in 1992 for the third edition of GURPS (Generic Universal Role-Playing System).

Description
This book describes the setting of the Mad Lands, where insane gods reshape reality at a whim, and the players' characters can only hope to survive. Topics covered include
 The Land: weather, terrain and fauna
 Local culture and society, and details of daily life
 Designing a character for this setting 
 The pantheon of ten gods
 Monsters and beasts
 Shamanism and sorcery
 How to design to campaign
 A sample village called Kawa Tok, describing notable people
 Six short adventure ideas

Publication history
Steve Jackson Games (SJG) first published the rules for GURPS in 1986, then immediately released a second edition in 1987, and a third edition in 1988. GURPS Fantasy II was a supplement for the third edition rules, a 128-page softcover book written by Robin Laws and edited by Steve Jackson, with interior art by John Hartwell and cover art by Rob Prior.

In the 2014 book Designers & Dragons: The '90s, game historian Shannon Appelcline noted that game designer Robin Laws was contributing to the games fanzine Alarums & Excursions in the late 1980s, which led him to make contributions to the surreal role-playing game Over the Edge as it was being prepared for publication. His involvement with Alarums & Excursions "also led Laws to write GURPS Fantasy II for Steve Jackson Games that same year."

Reception
In the October 1993 edition of Dragon (Issue 198),  Rick Swan thought the tone was all wrong for a setting that "hints at dark fantasy, with the requisite gloomy atmosphere and life-threatening locales." But instead, Swan found things like a god named Zewa Zab the Gopher God "elicits as many chuckles as goose bumps. Mad Lands? They're mad all right, but that's 'mad' as in 'goofy'." He did compliment the "better-than-usual graphics" and "meticulously edited text," and called writer Robin Laws "a promising talent", complimenting his writing as "solid throughout." Swan was disappointed in the full colour map bound into the back of the book, calling it "the package's most disappointing feature [...] it has little value as a play aid" due to its few details. He also wanted more from the included adventures, finding them too short and lacking in detail. Swan concluded by giving the book an average rating of 3 out of 6, saying, "I was never intrigued as much as amused, perhaps because it's hard to get worked up over a deity resembling a giant moose [...] Adventures in the Mad Lands boasts an exquisite premise, but it could use a bolder vision." "

Other reviews
 The Last Province Issue 4 (June/July 1993)

References

Fantasy campaign settings
Fantasy role-playing games
Fantasy II
Role-playing game supplements introduced in 1992